John Davy may refer to:

John Davy (chemist) (1790–1868), British chemist and younger brother of Sir Humphy Davy
John Davy (cricketer) (born 1974), Irish cricketer
John Davy (composer) (1763–1824), English composer
John M. Davy (1835–1909), U.S. Representative from New York
John Davy (Blessed), English Carthusian monk executed during the English Reformation
John Davey (Cornish speaker) of Zennor (1812–1891), Cornwall; considered to be one of the last people to have traditional knowledge of the Cornish language
John Davy (MP), MP for Dorchester
John Davy (journalist) (1927–1984), British journalist and science editor

See also
Jonny Davy, death metal musician
John Davie (disambiguation)
John Davey (disambiguation)
John Davy Hayward (1905–1965), English writer
John Davys (disambiguation)
John Davis (disambiguation)
John Davies (disambiguation)